is a retired Japanese table tennis player. He became the youngest Japanese national champion at the age of 17. His consecutive singles titles at the national championships from 2007 to 2011 made him the first man to win the event five times in a row.

After defeating Vladimir Samsonov for the bronze medal by 4–1 in the 2016 Rio Olympics, he finally seized his first singles medal in the three main international tournaments. It was also the first Olympic table tennis singles medal of his country.

Career

2021 
In March, Jun Mizutani played in the WTT Star Contender event at WTT Doha, but he suffered a round-of-16 upset to Ruwen Filus.

In June, Mizutani claimed that he and Mima Ito had a 70–80% chance of medalling and a 30% chance of winning the gold medal in mixed doubles at the Tokyo Olympics. Mizutani will also play in the team event in Tokyo.

In July, Mizutani and Mima Ito defeated Liu Shiwen and Xu Xin in the mixed doubles finals to become the first non-Chinese to win gold at an Olympic table tennis event since 2004.

Personal life
Mizutani married his girlfriend on 22 November 2013. On 14 October 2014, he posted on his blog, "This is already a bit late. This is my daughter. She is always my cure."

Mizutani appeared in the 2017 film Mixed Doubles as himself.

Career records

Singles
As of August 12, 2016
Olympics: round of 32 (2008), round of 16 (2012), 3rd place (2016)
World Championships: QF (2011, 2015).
World Cup appearances: 5. Record: 4th (2010, 2011, 2014, 2015).
ITTF World Tour winner (7): Korea Open 2009; Hungarian Open 2010; Kuwait Open, Japan Open 2012, Slovenia Open, Australian Open, Polish Open 2016. Runner-up (4): Japan Open 2010; Japan Open 2011; Japan Open 2014; Austrian Open 2015.
ITTF World Tour Grand Finals: winner (2010, 2014).
Asian Games: SF (2010).
Asian Championships: QF (2009, 2012).
Asian Cup: 3rd (2007, 2014, 2015).

Men's doubles
World Championships: SF (2009).
ITTF World Tour winner (2): China (Suzhou), Japan Open 2009. Runner-up (4): Chinese Taipei Open 2006; German, English Open 2009; Hungarian Open 2010.
Asian Games: QF (2006).
Asian Championships: SF (2007).

Mixed doubles
World Championships: round of 16 (2009).
Ittf Tour Winner (2020)
Olympic: Winner (2021)

Team
Olympics: 5th (2008, 2012), 2nd (2016).
World Championships: 3rd (2008, 10, 12, 14), 2nd (2016).
World Team Cup: 5th (2009).
Asian Games: SF (2010, 14).
Asian Championships: 2nd (2007, 09, 12, 13).

References

1989 births
Living people
Japanese male table tennis players
Olympic table tennis players of Japan
Table tennis players at the 2008 Summer Olympics
Table tennis players at the 2012 Summer Olympics
Table tennis players at the 2016 Summer Olympics
Table tennis players at the 2020 Summer Olympics
Olympic medalists in table tennis
Olympic silver medalists for Japan
Olympic bronze medalists for Japan
Olympic gold medalists for Japan
Table tennis players at the 2006 Asian Games
Table tennis players at the 2010 Asian Games
Table tennis players at the 2014 Asian Games
Asian Games medalists in table tennis
Medalists at the 2016 Summer Olympics
Medalists at the 2020 Summer Olympics
Universiade medalists in table tennis
Medalists at the 2010 Asian Games
Medalists at the 2014 Asian Games
Asian Games bronze medalists for Japan
World Table Tennis Championships medalists
Japanese expatriate sportspeople in China
Universiade bronze medalists for Japan
Kinoshita Meister Tokyo players
Medalists at the 2009 Summer Universiade
21st-century Japanese people